Thomas Hübener (born 25 June 1982) is a German footballer who can play in defence or midfield. He is a free agent after having last played for Energie Cottbus.

References

External links
 

1982 births
Living people
German footballers
Bayer 04 Leverkusen II players
SC Fortuna Köln players
Dynamo Dresden players
Arminia Bielefeld players
FC Energie Cottbus players
2. Bundesliga players
3. Liga players
Association football defenders